General elections were held in Honduras to elect a president and parliament on 30 November 1997. They were also the first elections in which the left wing Democratic Unification Party was allowed to stand.

Carlos Roberto Flores of the Liberal Party was elected president, defeating Nora Gúnera de Melgar who was the first woman to stand for the Presidency.  Major campaign issues were crime and rising living standards.

Results

President

National Congress

References

Bibliography
Allison, Michael E. “The transition from armed opposition to electoral opposition in Central America.”  Latin American politics and society 48, 4:137-162 (winter 2006).
D’Ans, André-Marcel. “Honduras: d’un libéralisme à l’autre.”  Problèmes d’Amérique latine 30:31-57 (juillet-septembre 1998).
Elections in the Americas A Data Handbook Volume 1. North America, Central America, and the Caribbean. Edited by Dieter Nohlen. 2005.
Izaguirre, Ramón. “Análisis del caso de Honduras.” Sistemas de elecciones parliamentarias y su relación con la gobernabilidad democrática. 2000. San José: Instituto Interamericano de Derechos Humanos. 2000.
Martínez, José Filadelfo.  “Participación política de Unificación Democrática.” Revista política de Honduras 8:143-156 (August 1999).
Navarro, Julio César. “Los mitos del voto separado en las elecciones de 1997.” Revista política de Honduras 1:183-193 (January 1999). 1999.
Political handbook of the world 1997. New York, 1998.
Robleda Castro, Agapito. “Violan la constitución y la ley electoral.”  Revista política de Honduras 28:65-67 (July–August 2001).
Rodriguez, Edgardo Antonio.  Elecciones ‘97: perfiles biográficos y políticos.  Tegucigalpa:  Guardabarranco. 1997.
Ruhl, J. Mark. “Doubting democracy in Honduras.”  Current history 81-86 (February 1997).
Ruhl, J. Mark. “Honduras:  militarism and democratization in troubled waters.”  Repression, resistance, and democratic transition in Central America.  2000.  Wilmington:  Scholarly Resources.
Taylor-Robinson, Michelle M. “La política hondureña y las elecciones de 2005.” Revista de ciencia política 26, 1:114-124 (2006). 2006.
Villars, Rina.  Para la casa más que para el mundo:  sufragismo y feminismo en la historia de Honduras.  Tegucigalpa:  Editorial Guaymuras. 2001.

Elections in Honduras
Honduras
1997 in Honduras
Presidential elections in Honduras
November 1997 events in North America